NUK is a German baby-products company based in Zeven, Germany. Owned by Newell Brands, the letters originally stood for “Natürlich Und Kiefergerecht” (Natural And Orthodontic).

History 
In 1956 the dentists Wilhelm Balters and Adolf Müller developed an asymmetrically shaped teat for feeding and calming babies. The doctors observed that babies who were breastfed were less likely to later suffer from misaligned teeth and jaw deformations. The two doctors developed the asymmetrical shape of the NUK teat based on the anatomy of the child's palate.

The export department was set up in 1975 and NUK products were subsequently exported from the Zeven location to 48 countries.

References

External links 

 https://www.nuk.de

Notes
 Rhymes with "book"

Trademarks
Infant products companies